"On a Good Night" is a song written by Larry Boone, Don Cook and Paul Nelson, and recorded by American country music artist Wade Hayes.  It was released in May 1996 as the lead-off single and title from Hayes' album On a Good Night.  The song reached number 2 on the Billboard Hot Country Songs chart and number 4 on the Canadian RPM country singles chart.  It is his second highest-peaking single.

Content
The song is an uptempo ode to what really makes a good night. The narrator discusses many different things that occur during a good night, including meeting a woman.

Critical reception
Deborah Evans Price, of Billboard magazine reviewed the song favorably, saying that Hayes sounds more self-assured and confident than on previous singles. She goes on to say that the combination of Cook's and Hayes' vocals make for an extremely appealing single.

Music video
The music video, like most of Wade Hayes' videos, was directed by Steven Goldmann. It takes place at a party in a barn. Wade is inside playing on stage. The video focuses on a clumsy woman that he notices in the audience who keeps falling down and even interrupts the song when she trips and disconnects the power cord.

Chart performance
"On a Good Night" debuted at number sixty-one on the U.S. Billboard Hot Country Singles & Tracks for the week of May 11, 1996.

Year-end charts

References

Official Music video for "On a Good Night" on Metacafe

1996 singles
1996 songs
Wade Hayes songs
Songs written by Larry Boone
Songs written by Don Cook
Song recordings produced by Don Cook
Columbia Records singles
Music videos directed by Steven Goldmann
Songs written by Paul Nelson (songwriter)